Autologous matrix-induced chondrogenesis (AMIC) is a treatment for articular cartilage damage. It combines microfracture surgery with the application of a bi-layer collagen I/III membrane.
There is tentative short to medium term benefits as of 2017.

The initialism AMIC, often used as a genericized trademark, is a registered trademark of Ed. Geistlich Söhne AG, protected by German Registration No. 30255356  and international Registration No. 840373.

The procedure described below relates specifically to the use of a collagen membrane, but recent advances now allow the use, using the same surgical procedure of non woven bio degradable materials that were initially developed for cell culturing of chondrocytes to be employed. These purely synthetic materials ( contain no animal derived products) are often further enhanced by impregnation of the material with high concentrations of Hyaluronic acid, which has been shown to be required to stimulate the differentiation of stem cells migrating from the bone marrow into chondrocytes (the true cartilage cell) and the resultant synthesis of type 2 collagen, the same native collagen found in the undamaged cartilage tissue. These enhanced synthetic biodegradable materials have been used to treat lesions in the knee, ankle, hip and great toe.

Procedure 

Autologous Matrix Induced Chondrogenesis (AMIC) surgery is a single step procedure. After arthroscopic evaluation of the cartilage damage and decision for an AMIC procedure a mini arthrotomy is performed. An all-arthroscopic AMIC procedure for repair of cartilage defects of the knee is also possible.

First the cartilage defect is exposed and cleaned whereby all unstable degenerated cartilage, including the calcified cartilage layer, are carefully removed. An imprint of the defect is then taken using a sterile moldable material (e.g. aluminium foil) and transferred to the collagen membrane which is cut to shape. The surgeon then creates tiny holes/fractures in the subchondral bone plate (microfracturing) with a special awl. Blood and bone marrow (containing stem cells) are released forming a blood clot which contains cartilage forming elements. The correctly sized collagen membrane is added to the microfractured area either by fibrin glue (autologous or commercially available) or suturing. Through flexion of the joint, the stable positioning of the membrane is verified and the wound is closed.

An essential requirement for satisfying outcome of the AMIC surgery is the compliance to a strict physical therapy program. Guidelines and recommendations exist, though they have to be adapted to the individual patients needs.

History
The AMIC procedure was first proposed by Behrens in 2003. it aims to extend the use of microfracture surgery to larger cartilage lesions > 2.5 cm2. Its clinical efficiency in autologous chondrocyte implantation (ACI), another cartilage repair technique for larger cartilage lesions, has been studied.

In general various factors have been identified known to influence the result after cartilage repair regardless of the technique used. Amongst them are the species and age of the individual, the size and localization of the articular cartilage defect, the surgical technique, and the postoperative rehabilitation protocol. The latter has been found especially important for microfracture surgery and therefore for AMIC.

The basic procedure of Microfracture surgery was developed by JR Steadman in the late 80’s and early 90’s. It is a well documented cartilage repair technique and first line treatment option for small cartilage lesions. AMIC evolved with the aim to improve some of the shortfalls of microfracture surgery as for instance variable repair cartilage volume and functional deterioration over time.

References

External links 

Orthopedic surgical procedures